Pirate metal is a style of heavy metal music characterized by its incorporation of pirate mythology within the music and sometimes in stage performances. Lyrics often use piratical jargon and various musical genres, such as thrash metal, speed metal, and folk metal, may be combined with traditional-sounding songs like sea shanties. Folk instruments, such as the concertina, can be incorporated or emulated with synthesizers. Band members often dress up in period costume during performances, and concert attendees may do so as well. Pirate metal is sometimes referred to by the media as a music scene.

History and notable bands

The earliest example of pirate metal most likely appeared when Australian heavy metal band Black Jack released their 1979 and 1983 demos, and their later 1985 vinyl EP, 'Five Pieces O' Eight'. Their pirate themes, lyrics, stage shows and imagery were a precursor to later, more mainstream pirate metal. Black Jack's stage show featured costumes, sets, props and mock hangings.

Pirate metal was more widely established and popularized by German heavy metal band Running Wild. They released their third album, Under Jolly Roger in 1987, and according to Rolf Kasparek, lead singer and guitarist for the band, the album's pirate theme was not planned. Instead, it grew from the album's title song. Eventually, the album's artwork was changed to match the title, and set decorations and costumes for future concerts were designed. The piratical lyrics also became a way to convey the band's political message, since their use of the devil as a symbolic figure was being misunderstood on their first album Gates to Purgatory. Kasparek began reading about pirates and, after finding "everything very interesting", he incorporated the motifs into their music. The subject matter was expanded during rehearsals for the fourth release, Port Royal, and their trademark style was solidified.

Although Kasparek was more interested in the true histories of the Golden Age of Piracy, pirate metal would eventually be inspired, to a greater extent, by the inaccuracies as invented or portrayed in novels and Hollywood films.

In 2006, after a two-year hiatus, Christopher Bowes and Gavin Harper reformed their band, Battleheart. Napalm Records signed them to the label, and they were told to change their name; Bowes and Harper easily agreed and settled on Alestorm. Since then, the band is responsible for reviving the popularity of pirate metal with their pirate image and humor in their albums and performances.

In addition to Alestorm, another pirate metal band in the UK, Detritus, combine thrash metal, Christian metal and pirate motifs.

Swashbuckle is another band labelled pirate metal, known for its pirate image and humorous stage performances.

The Dread Crew of Oddwood is a San Diego-based band that does acoustic folk metal with a pirate theme.

Red Rum are a pirate metal band from the East Midlands in the United Kingdom known for their cover of They're Taking the Hobbits to Isengard. They have toured with Skiltron, Lagerstein, and Iron Seawolf.

The Netherlands also has its own pirate metal band called Schtack. They were founded in 2008, and their first studio album was released in 2013.

Storm Seeker is a German pirate-folk-metal band from Düsseldorf and Neuss.

Skull and Bones is another pirate metal band from Argentina with their main theme centered around the golden age of piracy.

References

Heavy metal genres
Pirates in popular culture
Extreme metal